Villanova College is a private, Roman Catholic school for boys located in Coorparoo, a southern suburb of Brisbane, Queensland, Australia. The school has a non-selective enrolment policy for all years and caters for approximately 1,340 boys in three schools, Junior, Middle and Senior from year five to twelve. Established in 1948 by six Irish priests, led by Fr Ben O'Donnell, OSA, who were from the Order of Saint Augustine in the suburb of Hamilton.  In 1954, due to lack of prospects for growth in Hamilton, the College moved to its present site at Coorparoo. The college is a member of the Association of Heads of Independent Schools of Australia (AHISA), The Independent Primary School Heads of Australia (IPSHA) and the Associated Independent Colleges (AIC).

History

Whinstanes (1948–1953)
Whinstaines House (after which the suburb was named) was built by prominent society figure Alexander Brand Webster. After his death the house and remaining 9 acres of land were sold in 1925 to Our Lady of the Sacred Heart who established College Whinstanes, which opened as a Junior Boys Boarding School. The school’s motto “Vincit Veritas” is the Webster motto was borrowed from a stained glass window in Whinstaines Hose with the Webster crest.

In 1948, Archbishop James Duhig welcomed Fr O'Donnell with five other Irish Augustinians to Australia, and invited them to start a school in Brisbane. They subsequently established Villanova in the suburb of Whinstanes (now part of Hamilton). On 25 January 1948, the college was officially opened by the Chancellor of the University of Queensland, William Forgan-Smith, who raised the college flag in front of the main entrance and was blessed by Archbishop Duhig. In 1953 a decision was made to move the college due to lack of prospects for expansion in Whinstanes.

Coorparoo (1954–present)
Early in the 1880s, merchant Reuben Nicklin built a large house Langlands in Coorparoo. In 1886, Nicklin built another house Hatherton (now Queen Alexandra Home) at another site in Coorparoo and sold the Langlands house and its grounds. (Nicklin and his wife died in the wreck of the RMS Quetta in 1890). Thomas Connah and William Brookes bought a large block of land that included Nicklin's house. Connah resided in Nicklin's former residence. Connah became Queensland Auditor-general and he sold Langlands to Archbishop James Duhig in 1916. Langlands became the Good Samaritan Convent of Saint Scholastica until 1953, when Villanova College moved from Whinstanes to the Coorparoo property.
The school was officially opened on 22 November 1953 by Archbishop Duhig. The building had been built at a cost of £50,000 and could accommodate 500 students. In the 1960s/70s, a library, science laboratories, senior classrooms and a new primary block joined the existing buildings on the campus. During this period, the college saw additional co-curricular facilities including a swimming pool on campus and sporting fields at Tingalpa. During the 1970s/80s the College saw the foundation of the Student Council as well as the leadership role of all the boys in the senior class which led to the abolition of the prefect system. The election of captain and vice-captains of the school and houses by the senior class was started. The Goold Gymnasium and Assembly Hall was built as well as more classrooms, new science laboratories, a technical drawing room and some Art rooms.

The late eighties and nineties saw the governance of the College now entrusted to a College Council composed of staff, parents, Augustinians, past students and friends of the College. It also saw new courses start in computing, and catering start at the college and the introduction of a campus-wide computer network as well as computers in classrooms. The 1990s saw the college split from the TAS competition and the foundation of the AIC Competition.

In process of the College's new masterplan, the newest addition to the Villanova is the Saint Thomas of Villanova Learning Centre. 

In 2006 the college inaugurated its three present schools:
 Junior School, consisting of Years 5 and 6
 Middle School, incorporating Years 7, 8 & 9 
 Senior School - Years 10, 11 & 12.

The most recent building in the college is Saint Thomas of Villanova Learning Centre (released in late 2020). The St Thomas of Villanova Learning Centre, with outstanding views of the Brisbane skyline, has been designed for twenty-first-century learning. It adds six classrooms to the Senior Precinct of the College along with an auditorium, facilities for the Head of Senior School and Pastoral Leaders, a common area and spacious breakout areas for individual and group learning. Students experience a taste of tertiary culture while still in high school. Levels One and Two of the St Thomas of Villanova Learning Centre constitute the new Junior School of the College. Twelve open-area classrooms with wide and varied breakout areas allow for cooperative teaching and learning. With new reception areas for parents and the needed facilities for staff, the Junior School is equipped for the years ahead. Undercover areas and immediate access to Whinstanes Oval contribute to the students experiencing “boy’s heaven” at Villanova

House system
Villanova College has four houses which compete in inter-house athletics, cross-country and swimming, as well as many other school based activities.

Rectors of College and Principals of College
There have been 8 Augustinian rectors at Villanova College in its history. The traditional job of the rector was to lead the college but this changed after the retirement of Fr. Michael Morahan in 2009. Now Villanova College has a lay principal with the priests living in the priory at Villanova College looking after school Masses. The current chaplain of the college is Fr Peter Wieneke.

Co-curriculum

Sport
The college is a foundation member of the Associated Independent Colleges (AIC). The college has sporting fields at Tingalpa, in Brisbane's east suburbs. The AIC sporting association is for all years from fives to Open. It comprises 8 schools, Marist College Ashgrove, St Edmunds College, Ipswich, St Patrick's College, Iona College, Padua College, St Laurence's College and St. Peters Lutheran College. The sports played by the association are rugby union, soccer, cricket, basketball, volleyball, tennis, swimming, chess, Water Polo, athletics and cross country.

AIC premierships 
Villanova College has won the following AIC premierships.

 Basketball (8) - 2002, 2004, 2009, 2012, 2013, 2019, 2021, 2022
 Cricket (6) - 2001, 2002, 2012, 2013, 2019, 2021
 Rugby - 2010
 Soccer (5) - 2005, 2007, 2012, 2013, 2022
 Tennis (5) - 2000, 2002, 2004, 2005, 2012
 Volleyball (5) - 2000, 2001, 2002, 2012, 2022
 AFL (1) - 2022

Music

The college currently has over 30 main music ensembles including:
 Symphony orchestras
 String orchestras
 Concert bands
 Vocal ensembles
 Guitar ensembles
 Percussion ensembles
 Sport/Spirit Drumlines
 Jazz ensembles
 Commercial (contemporary) ensembles
 Irish ensembles
 Chamber string, woodwind and brass ensembles
The college hosts Queensland's largest music festival for Catholic schools and colleges, Queensland Catholic Schools & College's Music Festival (QCMF). Villanova is home to a music centre, known as the Augustine Centre. Within this centre is the Hanrahan Theatre, named after the second rector of the college, Fr John Hanrahan. Music at Villanova College is a true community enterprise, thanks to enthusiastic support from staff, students, parents, and the local and greater Brisbane communities. Considered an inclusive art, there is a place for all students in our music program, so long as they have the necessary desire and commitment to create music at the highest possible standard.

Cultural and spiritual
Villanova runs musical productions in conjunction with Loreto College every two years. Recent productions have been Crazy for You (2014), Guys and Dolls (2016), and most recently High School Musical (2022). Students of Chinese language studies have the opportunity to visit China every second year. The music department holds a Music Tour for all students in the colleges Senior Ensembles every two years, the most recent tours being to the United States in 2013, Tasmania in 2015, New Zealand in 2017 as part of the Rhapsody Rotorua Music Festival, Sydney in 2019 with the Senior Perucssion Ensemble and Villanova Conkestra, where students performed at world-class venues including the Sydney Opera House.

Notable incidents

Brick wall collapse 
On December 27, 2016, an eight-metre high section of brick wall collapsed in the senior school's Veritas building. No students were injured, as the collapse occurred over the Christmas school holiday. Principal Mark Stower stated the timing of the collapse was "the grace of God." The collapse occurred during a rectification project on the Veritas building to replace non-galvanised steel, of which was used in the original construction, with galvanised steel.

Cor Unum Centre fire 
On September 27, 2017, the Cor Unum Centre, located on Villanova Park, was destroyed after a fire engulfed the centre, causing irreversible damage to the facility and the grandstand connected to it. The centre was demolished and replaced with a new grandstand in 2019.

Father Michael Endicott indecent treatment convictions 
On June 24, 2010, Father Michael Ambrose Endicott, a former priest at the school, appeared in Brisbane Magistrates Court and plead guilty to two counts of indecent treatment of a child. On two separate occasions in 1977 and 1978, Father Endicott had photographed the same student naked. On one occasion, the student was taken out of class and into the bush land, where the student was photographed naked. On the other occasion, the student was taken to the school's bell tower and was photographed naked. Father Endicott was given a one-year jail sentence, of which was wholly suspended.

On April 17, 2019, Father Endicott was convicted of three counts of indecent treatment with a child, after it was alleged by another former student that between 1975 and 1981, he was photographed naked on three separate occasions. The former student had been first photographed on a school hiking trip, in which the then nine-year-old student had naked pictures taken of him by a creek. The former student then alleged he was abused similarly on two other occasions. Father Endicott was sentenced to 18 months in jail, with his sentence to be suspended after 6 months served in prison. The conviction was later overturned in Endicott's favour, as at the time, Queensland law did not consider taking nude photographs of a child to be indecent dealing. Villanova College has since posted an official apology.

Notable alumni

Villanova Old Boys Association Incorporated (VOBAI) is the association for all old boys of the college.

Arts
 James Moloney – author, best known for The Book of Lies, The Gracey Trilogy, and A Bridge to Wiseman's Cove.
Politics
George Brandis – King's Counsel, Senator, Leader of the Government in the Senate, Attorney-General of Australia, High Commissioner to the United Kingdom
Paul Lucas (politician) – former Queensland Parliamentarian and former Deputy Premier of Queensland
Gordon Nuttall – former State of Queensland Government (Labor) Minister
Kerry Shine – (Australian Labor Party) Former Queensland Attorney General and Minister for Justice; State Member for Toowoomba North
Ross Vasta – Federal Liberal Member for Bonner
Drew Pavlou - Student Activist at the University of Queensland  

Sport
 Brad Meyers – Rugby League player for the Brisbane Broncos (1998–2004), Bradford Bulls (2005-2007) and Gold Coast Titans (2008–2011)
 Ben Mowen – former Wallaby captain and former captain of the ACT Brumbies
 Chris Simpson – former captain of the Queensland Bulls cricket team
 Andrew Slack – former Wallaby 39 caps (Captain 1984–1987) and Reds player (133 games for Queensland), head of Sports for Channel 9 News Brisbane
 Michael Zullo – current member of FC Utrecht. Has also played for the Australia national football team on 2 occasions.
Christian Welch - currently playing Rugby League for the Melbourne Storm. Also played Rugby League for the Queensland Maroons
 Will Sankey - currently playing Rugby Union for the Western Force in the Super Rugby. Making His Debut against the Melbourne Rebels on the 8th of April, 2022
Media and entertainment
 Dan Feuerriegel – actor, appeared in Spartacus: Blood and Sand, Home and Away, and McLeod's Daughters
 Chris Reason – journalist and Co-Host of Channel Seven's Sunday Sunrise
Law
 James S Douglas – Judge of the Supreme Court of Queensland, holder of degrees from The University of Queensland and Cambridge University
 Robert R Douglas – Judge of the Supreme Court of Queensland, former President of the Bar Association of Queensland, Knight of the Sovereign Military Order of Malta
 Peter Lyons - former Judge of the Supreme Court of Queensland and former president of the Bar Association of Queensland

Associated schools

Villanova's brother school is St. Augustine's College, Brookvale in Sydney. Loreto College is the sister school of Villanova College.

See also

Education in Australia
List of schools in Greater Brisbane
List of schools in Queensland

References

Sources
 Arneil, Stan; Out Where the Dead Men Lie (The Augustinians in Australia 1838–1992), Augustinian Press Brookvale (1992);

External links

Order of St Augustine, International Homepage
Order of St Augustine, Australian Homepage
Augnet International Cooperative Web Site for Schools in the Tradition of St. Augustine
Text of the Rule of St. Augustine
Queensland Catholic Schools and Colleges Music Festival

Catholic primary schools in Brisbane
Catholic secondary schools in Brisbane
Augustinian schools
Junior School Heads Association of Australia Member Schools
Educational institutions established in 1948
Coorparoo, Queensland
1948 establishments in Australia